The term Semitic religions most commonly refers to the Abrahamic religions, including Judaism, Christianity, and Islam.

Semitic religions may also refer to:

Ancient Semitic religion, polytheistic pre-Abrahamic religions practiced by Ancient Semitic peoples
Semitic neopaganism, religions based on or attempting to reconstruct ancient Semitic religions

See also 
Shem
Semitic (disambiguation)